Herbert Wagner (born 6 April 1935) is a German theoretical physicist, who mainly works in statistical mechanics. He is a professor emeritus of Ludwig Maximilian University of Munich.



Biography
Wagner was one of the last students of German theoretical physicist and Nobel prize winner Werner Heisenberg, with whom he worked on magnetism.

As a postdoc at Cornell University, he and David Mermin (and independently of Pierre Hohenberg) proved a "no-go theorem", otherwise known as the Mermin–Wagner theorem. The theorem states that continuous symmetries cannot be spontaneously broken at finite temperature in systems with sufficiently short-range interactions in dimensions .

Wagner is the academic father of a generation of statistical physicists. Many of his students and junior collaborators now occupy chairs in German universities, including
Hans Werner Diehl (Essen),
Siegfried Dietrich (Wuppertal, then Max-Planck-Institut für Metallforschung Stuttgart),
Gerhard Gompper (Forschungszentrum Jülich),
Reinhard Lipowsky (Max Planck Institute of Colloids and Interfaces, Berlin),
Hartmut Löwen (Düsseldorf),
Klaus Mecke (Erlangen),
and Udo Seifert (Stuttgart).

Awards
In 1992, Wagner was awarded an honorary degree by the University of Essen (now University of Duisburg-Essen). In 2016 he received the Max Planck Medal for his fundamental works on the statistical physics of low-dimensional systems.

References

20th-century German physicists
1935 births
Academic staff of the Ludwig Maximilian University of Munich
Living people
Theoretical physicists
Winners of the Max Planck Medal